Rudie Sypkes (20 May 1950 – 8 February 2008) was an Australian businessman from Tasmania. Sypkes was the co-founder of the Chickenfeed retail chain.

Biography
Sypkes was born in Tasmania to immigrant parents from the Netherlands. He began his business career by helping his father, Engel, found the Purity supermarket chain. Sypkes later founded, with his brother, Peter launched the Chickenfeed Bargain Stores, a chain of discount retail stores located throughout Tasmania. They sold the Chickenfeed chain in 2001 for an estimated $35 million Australian dollars. Sypkes often quietly contributed to philanthropic causes throughout Tasmania using his personal fortune.

Sypkes revealed in July 2007 that he had been diagnosed with idiopathic pulmonary fibrosis and donated  towards research into respiratory disease. Sypkes died suddenly and unexpectedly at a hospital in Tasmania on 8 February 2008. He had been on a waiting list for a lung transplant for nine months. He was survived by his wife and three children.

References

External links
Chickenfeed Bargain Stores
 The Mercury: Rudie Sypkes' shock death
Sunday Tasmanian: Sypkes quiet philanthropist
The Mercury: Farewell to the discount doyen
The Mercury: Good fortune well spent

2008 deaths
People from Tasmania
Australian people of Dutch descent
Australian philanthropists
1950 births
Place of death unknown
20th-century philanthropists
20th-century Australian businesspeople